Paul Beekmans (born 3 January 1982) is a Dutch football manager and former player who mainly played as a defensive midfielder. He is currently assistant manager of Eerste Divisie side FC Den Bosch.

Club career
He formerly played for FC Den Bosch, SC Cambuur, Almere City FC, Eindhoven and Gold Coast United.

FC Den Bosch
Beekmans played in 195 games for FC Den Bosch, from 2002 until 2008 in the Eredivisie and Eerste Divisie and scored 23 goals. He returned to the club in summer 2015 as an amateur while also working as an account manager at the club.

SC Cambuur
Beekmans spent three seasons at SC Cambuur, playing 99 games for the team in the Eerste Divisie.

Gold Coast United
On 8 June 2011, Beekmans signed a contract with Australian A-League team Gold Coast United.

References

External links
 Voetbal International profile 

1982 births
Living people
People from Vught
Association football midfielders
Dutch footballers
FC Den Bosch players
Gold Coast United FC players
Almere City FC players
FC Eindhoven players
Eerste Divisie players
Eredivisie players
A-League Men players
FC Den Bosch managers
Dutch expatriate footballers
Expatriate soccer players in Australia
Dutch expatriate sportspeople in Australia
Dutch football managers